Diabrotica barberi, the northern corn rootworm, is a species of skeletonizing leaf beetle in the family Chrysomelidae. It is found in North America. Adults feed on corn, and, when corn is unavailable, goldenrod pollen.

References

Further reading

External links

 

Galerucinae
Articles created by Qbugbot
Beetles described in 1967